Major General William George Walker  (28 May 1863 – 16 February 1936) was a senior British Army officer and a recipient of the Victoria Cross.

Details
Walker was 39 years old, and a captain in the 4th Gurkha Rifles, Indian Army, attached to the Bikanir Camel Corps during the Third Somaliland Expedition when, on 22 April 1903 after the action at Daratoleh, British Somaliland, the rearguard got considerably behind the rest of the column. Captain Walker and George Murray Rolland, with four other men were with a fellow officer when he fell badly wounded, and while one went for assistance, Captain Walker and the rest stayed with him, endeavouring to keep off the enemy. This they succeeded in doing, and when the officer in command of the column, John Edmund Gough, arrived, they managed to get the wounded man on to a camel. He was, however, hit a second time and died immediately.

He later served in the First World War as Commander of 9th Sirhind Brigade from August 1914 and achieved the rank of major general in 1915 as General Officer Commanding 2nd Division. His Victoria Cross is displayed at the National Army Museum, Chelsea, London.

Walker was cremated at the Woodvale Crematorium in Brighton, East Sussex, and is commemorated there.

See also
List of Brigade of Gurkhas recipients of the Victoria Cross

Notes

References
Location of grave and VC medal(East Sussex)

1863 births
1936 deaths
British recipients of the Victoria Cross
British Indian Army generals
Companions of the Order of the Bath
British military personnel of the Third Somaliland Expedition
People from Nainital
Indian Army personnel of World War I
Military personnel of British India